Stephen Kaplan may refer to:

 Stephen Kaplan (paranormal investigator) (1940–1995), paranormal investigator
 Stephen Kaplan (psychologist), environmental psychologist
 Stephen Kaplan (fencer) (born 1949), American Olympic fencer
 Stephen Kaplan (investor), American businessman and co-founder of Oaktree Capital Management

See also
 Steven Kaplan (disambiguation)